Nakhla is a short cut for the Arabic version of Michael (Mikhail) in upper Egypt (south of Egypt). So some Mikhails in upper Egypt are referred to as Nakhla.

Nakhla is also an Arabic word for palm tree.

People 
 Adel Nakhla, an American-Egyptian civilian translator
 Ahmed Nakhla (born 1971), footballer
 Margaret Nakhla (1908–1977)
 Melanie Nakhla
 Michel Nakhla, professor and researcher

Arabic words and phrases